, abbreviated to  or NU, is a  Japanese national research university located in Chikusa-ku, Nagoya. It was the seventh Imperial University in Japan, one of the first five Designated National University and selected as a Top Type university of Top Global University Project by the Japanese government. It is the 3rd highest ranked higher education institution in Japan (84th worldwide).

The university is the birthplace of the Sakata School of physics and the Hirata School of chemistry. As of 2021, seven Nobel Prize winners have been associated with Nagoya University, the third most in Japan and Asia behind Kyoto University and the University of Tokyo.

History 

Nagoya University traces its roots back to 1871 when it was the Temporary Medical School/Public Hospital. In 1939 it became Nagoya Imperial University, the last Imperial University of Japanese Empire. In 1947 it was renamed Nagoya University, and became a Japanese national university. In 2014, according to the reform measures of the Ministry of Education, Culture, Sports, Science and Technology (MEXT), all Japanese national universities has been incorporated as a National University Corporation. The university has a profound tradition of physics and chemistry. Many world-class scientific research achievements include Sakata model, PMNS matrix, Okazaki fragment, Noyori asymmetric hydrogenation, and Blue LED were born in Nagoya University.

In March 2012, Nagoya University played host to the International Symposium on Innovative Nanobiodevices. Three years later, NU was selected as one of the five champion universities for gender equality by the United Nations Entity for Gender Equality and the Empowerment of Women.

The team under Professor Morishima Kunihiro participated in the Scanpyramids project by using special nuclear emulsion plates. This led to the discovery in 2017 of new chambers in the great pyramid.

In March 2018, Nagoya University was selected as one of first five Designated National University. In order to become the largest national higher education corporation in Japan, the Tokai National Higher Education and Research System established by integrating with Gifu University  in April 2020, both are major universities in Tōkai region.

The Nobel Prizes 
In the 20th century, NU's Kuno Yasu and Katsunuma Seizō were nominated for the Nobel Prize in Physiology or Medicine, Yoshio Ohnuki was nominated for the Nobel Prize in Physics, and Yoshiyuki Toyama was nominated for the Nobel Prize in Chemistry.

In the 21st century, NU people account for half of the total number of Japanese Nobel Prize winners (up to 2014). Among the six winners of Nobel Prize in Natural Science, there are three professors and five alumni. The number of winners is the third among Japanese and Asian universities. The 2021 Nobel laureate Syukuro Manabe engaged as a specially invited professor at Nagoya University from December 2007 to March 2014.

Overview

Ideal 
The ideal written in the Nagoya University Academic Charter is to encourage the intelligentsia with courage by providing an education which respects independent thought. Currently, NU's academic style and characteristics are "freedom, openness, and enterprising." When Nagoya Imperial University was just established, the first president was in a passage of the Seventeen-article constitution, and his motto, "Harmony is to be valued," was the basic spirit of the entire university.

Student population
While the majority of its students come from Tōkai region, Nagoya University has a good portion of students from all over Japan.

The school also has many students from abroad. As of 2021, the total student enrolment is 15,771, with a total of over 1,900 international students from more than 110 countries. The majority of them are from China (40%) and Korea (8.8%) (as of May 1, 2018). Among other countries and regions, Taiwan, Indonesia, Vietnam, Malaysia, Cambodia, Thailand, Mongolia and Germany are represented by more than 40 students.

Global 30 International Program

Global 30 Project
Due to its internationally recognized achievements and established academic standing, Nagoya University is selected as one of the Type A (Top Type) universities under the Top Global University Project by MEXT, and offers international programs designed for international students under the Global 30 (G30) International Program since 2011. The G30 International Programs are full-degree programs taught entirely in English, with a variety of majors in both undergraduate and graduate schools being offered, from the schools of humanities, law, economics, science, engineering, agriculture and medicine. Entrance is in October of each year, with first round of applications for most schools opening around November in the preceding year.

Features of the program
In addition to the major, international undergraduate students are required to take up to one year of Japanese classes according to their respective levels of proficiency during their first year. Intermediate, advanced, and business Japanese classes are also offered to students who wish to take them in order to further hone their language skills. Furthermore, class sizes are small and international students are advised to do research intensively. Humanities and social science students are required to write an independent thesis in the final year, and science and engineering students are required to work in student laboratory for one year and at least one year for thesis research. Each student in the program have assigned academic advisors and can have a tutor if they need or wish. 

Graduate programs are research-based, and applicants are required to know their research topic and find professors who share the same research interests before applying for the program.

Alumni Prospects

Many graduates from the G30 program continue to further their studies in various renowned universities worldwide, including Massachusetts Institute of Technology, University of Pennsylvania, Duke University, University of Oxford, Imperial College London, ETH Zürich, University of Tokyo, University of Melbourne, and more, including Nagoya University.  A substantial number of graduates also seek employment in Japan, obtaining jobs in companies that are listed on the Tokyo Stock Exchange.

Faculties and graduate schools

Faculties

Humanities
Education
Law
Economics
Informatics
Science
Medicine
Engineering
Agriculture

Graduate schools

Humanities
Education and Human Development
Law
Economics
Informatics
Science
Medicine
Engineering
Bioagricultural Sciences
International Development (GSID)
Mathematics
Environmental Studies
Pharmaceutical Sciences

Research Institutes 
Nagoya University houses many research institutes, such as Institute of Transformative Bio-Molecules (ITbM), Institute for Space-Earth Environmental Research (ISEE), Institute of Materials and Systems for Sustainability (IMaSS), and Kobayashi-Masakawa Institute for the Origin of Particles and the Universe (KMI). The university's Earthquake and Volcano Research Center is represented on the national Coordinating Committee for Earthquake Prediction.

Institute of Transformative Bio-Molecules (ITbM) 
ITbM was officially launched in April 2013, and is located in the Higashiyama campus of the university. It consists of a team of 14 principal investigators from within Nagoya University and other countries including Switzerland, Germany, Canada, and USA. ITbM has five research fields: ‘Parasitic plants’, ‘Chemistry-enabled plant adaptation’, ‘Clock diseases’, ‘Chemistry-enabled bioimaging’, and ‘Nanocarbon chemistry and biology’. Features of ITbM include having mix lab and offices, well-furnished with many high-quality instruments, and having English-speaking staff in the administration to facilitate the internationalization of the institute. ITbM also conducts the International Symposium on Transformative Bio-molecules (ISTbM) yearly in Nagoya, and presents awards such as the Hirata Award and Tsuneko & Reiji Okazaki Award to promising scientists in the fields of organic chemistry and biology.

Institute for Space-Earth Environmental Research (ISEE) 
ISEE was established in October 2015, via the integration of the Solar-Terrestrial Environment Laboratory, the Hydrospheric Atmospheric Research Center, and the Center for Chronological Research, and is recognised by MEXT as a "Joint Usage/Research Center". ISEE consists of seven research divisions and three research centers, with interdisciplinary research (termed as 'fusion research') projects undergoing. The institute aims to contribute to solving global environmental issues and the space-related advancement of mankind and society, while also furthering the cooperation between academia and industry. International cooperation and collaborative research are key features of ISEE, including a yearly international symposium, the ISEE Summer Internship which accepts students from domestic and foreign universities, several ongoing international programs and projects, among many more.

Institute of Materials and Systems for Sustainability (IMaSS) 
In 2004, the EcoTopia Science Institute was established through the restructuring and integration of several research centers, and was reorganized to NU's IMaSS in 2015. Its aim is to contribute to achieving an ecological and sustainable society via research on energy conservation, ranging from topics of materials and device technologies to system technologies, and is also recognised by MEXT as a "Joint Usage/Research Center". IMaSS consists of the Center for Integrated Research of Future Electronics (CIRFE), Advanced Measurement Technology Center (AMTC), Division of Materials Research (DM), Division of Systems Research (DS), two funded research divisions by Chubu Electric Power and Toyota Motor Corporation, and 10 industry–academia collaborative chairs. IMaSS also actively promotes international collaboration and joint research, and has research agreements with institutes and universities from many countries across the world including China, Korea, USA, France, Thailand, and many more.

Academic rankings

Nagoya University is one of the most prestigious universities in Japan. This can be seen in several rankings such as the ones shown below.

General rankings
The Academic Ranking of World Universities (ARWU) 2021 ranks Nagoya University as third in Japan and 84th worldwide.
Nagoya University is ranked 118th globally by the 2022 QS World University Rankings, and 28th by the 2022 QS Asian University rankings. Meanwhile, Times Higher Education World University Rankings 
ranks Nagoya University as seventh in Japan, and 351–400th globally.
The university has been maintaining its high rank within Japan for many years, having been ranked 15th in 2009 and 21st in 2010 in the ranking "Truly Strong Universities" by Toyo Keizai. In another ranking, Japanese prep school Kawaijuku ranked Nagoya as the 8th best university in Japan.

Research performance
Nagoya University is one of the top research institutions in Japan. It has obtained the 6th place in general rankings for scientific research in Japan, with 1.3% of publications being highly cited. Furthermore, Nagoya had the 5th highest number of patents accepted (111) in 2019 among Japanese universities.
According to a ranking released by  Thomson Reuters in 2011, Nagoya is the 5th best research university in Japan. Its research standard is especially high in Physics (6th in Japan, 61st in the world), Chemistry (7th in Japan, 43rd in the world), and Biology & Biochemistry (5th in Japan, 97th in the world).

Weekly Diamond reported that Nagoya has the 6th highest research standard in Japan in research funding per researchers in COE Program. In the same article, it is also ranked 6th in terms of the quality of education by GP funds per student.

In addition, Nikkei Shimbun on 16 February 2004 surveyed the research standards in Engineering studies based on Thomson Reuters, Grants in Aid for Scientific Research and questionnaires to heads of 93 leading Japanese research centers, and Nagoya was placed 9th (research planning ability 5th//informative ability of research outcome 9th/ability of business-academia collaboration 6th) in this ranking.
Nagoya University also has a high research standard in Social Science & Humanities. Asahi Shimbun summarized the number of academic papers in Japanese major legal journals by university, and Nagoya University was ranked 4th during 2005–2009. RePEc in January 2011 ranked Nagoya's Economic department as Japan's 13th best economic research university.

Graduate school rankings
Nagoya Law School is considered one of the top law schools in Japan, as it was ranked 10th in the pass rate of the Japanese Bar Examination in 2010.

Alumni rankings
According to Toyo Keizai's "Ranking of the 200 Best Universities with Graduates Employed at Major Companies" in 2020, graduates from Nagoya University have the 12th best employment rate in 400 major companies in Japan, compared to the 2010's rankings where Nagoya University was ranked 38th.

Popularity and selectivity
Nagoya is one of the most selective universities in Japan. Its entrance difficulty is usually considered one of the highest in Japan.

Evaluation from Business World

Exchange Programs

Study at Nagoya University 
International students interested in studying in Japan can enroll in the Nagoya University Program for Academic Exchange (NUPACE), given that they belong to one of many partner institutions affiliated with Nagoya University. Since its inception in 1996, over 2,300 international students from 155 institutions have participated in NUPACE (as of 2020). Students enrolled in this short-term, four- to twelve-months exchange program can select from a variety of courses in English and Japanese covering topics such as Japanese language, intercultural studies, or courses related to their major. Though some of these courses are specific for the NUPACE program, students can also take G30 courses or regular Japanese courses and share a learning environment with degree-seeking Nagoya University students, given that they meet certain language requirements. Additionally, students can also choose to conduct research under the guidance of Nagoya University faculty. While enrolled in NUPACE, students may stay at one of the various international dormitories, and are offered the same services (like student insurance counseling) available to degree-seeking Nagoya University students.

Outside of NUPACE, other exchange programs for international students are also available. Campus Asia invites undergraduate and graduate students from partner universities in China and Korea to discuss law and political science in East Asia. Graduate students in Engineering can participate in the Japan-US-Canada Advanced Collaborative Education Program (JUACEP) and spend two- to twelve-months exploring different research environments through conducting individual research projects in laboratories at Nagoya University. The school of Engineering also hosts the Nagoya University Summer Intensive Program (NUSIP), designed to provide students with the opportunity to engage with automobile technology in factories and research centers. A two-week, intensive Nagoya University Short-Term Japanese Language Program (NUSTEP) is available to those who want to build their Japanese language proficiency and provides various activities to enrich the participant’s understanding of Japanese culture and society.

International students can also pursue individual research and enroll in one of Nagoya University’s graduate schools as a research student under Nagoya University’s Research Student Program.

For Nagoya University students 

For degree-seeking Nagoya University students, the option to study abroad is also available. Students can study for 1 or 2 semesters in partner universities with which Nagoya University has an inter-university agreement, which includes 161 universities. Expanding that, students may also study at specific departments in universities with which Nagoya University has an inter-school agreement, which includes 306 universities offering exchange opportunities in one or more departments. Students in this program can also receive financial aid that covers part of travel expenses or offers a monthly stipend or loan during their time abroad. Graduate students in the School of Engineering can also participate in JUACEP, conducting independent research and immersing themselves in the research environment of institutes in the US and Canada.

Facilities

Libraries 
Nagoya University has many libraries, which were built to provide necessary academic information in education and research at the university. The Tsurumai Campus has Medical library, and the Daiko Campus has Library of Health Science. The Higashiyama Campus houses the Central Library, which is the largest in the university, and 22 other libraries under various schools and departments, such as Law, Economics, Science, and Engineering.

NU Co-op 
NU Co-op belongs to the National Federation of University Co-operative Associations, which is an organization that helps students and teaching staff experience a better campus life by supporting "study, research, and daily life at the university". NU Co-op supplies goods such as cafeteria meals, stationery, books, computers, etc. NU Co-op projects and services also include insurance for all students, liaison between students and driving schools, and travel ticketing services.

Campus life

Federation of Liberal Arts Circles 
The federation was founded in 1961, and aims to help facilitate "better communications between circles, increase in literacy of students, encourage better understanding of each other and enhance friendship, as well as promoting and developing cultural activities." Some examples of circles in Nagoya University include tea ceremony, art, volunteering activities, music and dance, and literature, among the wide range of more than 60 circles officially registered.

Athletic Association
The athletic association was founded in 1956, and currently has more than 50 member athletic clubs. 

Nagoya University and Osaka University hold regular Athletics Competition every year (名古屋大学・大阪大学対抗競技大会). In addition, the  has been held since 1962.

Nagoya University Festival "Meidai-sai" 
The university festival "Meidai-sai" is held every year in June since 1960, at the Higashiyama campus. Each year, the festival boasts a wide variety of approximately 100 events and activities, including laboratory tours, presentations, and hands-on activities organised by clubs and circles. Clubs and circles also set up food stalls selling various foods such as yakisoba (Japanese fried noodle dish) and kakigōri (shaved ice dessert).

Due to the COVID-19 pandemic, Meidai-sai was held online for both years 2020 and 2021.

International Student Organizations 
Nagoya University has several international student groups and associations established to help promote the well-being of international students and sustaining their proactive interaction with the Japanese student community. These student organizations mostly conduct events and activities to help international students adjust to living in Japan when they first arrive, and also connect with others who have similar interests. 

Some of the student organizations include Nagoya University International Student Group (NUISG), Nagoya University International Student Association (NUFSA), and Nagoya University Co-Op Foreign Student Association (COFSA), which are mainly responsible for welcome parties, cultural activities, and seminars on topics such as job hunting or further studies. Other international student-led groups include Nagoya University HeForShe Club (gender equality discussion circle) and N30N dance (dance circle).

NUISG (Nagoya University International Student Group) 

Nagoya University International Student Group (NUISG) is a student-run organisation representing Nagoya University's international G30 Program and was established in 2011. NUISG aims to create content that encourages interaction between the G30 student body, alumni, faculty and administration, provide quick and accurate information to G30 students, and nurture interaction between G30 and other student bodies in Nagoya University. NUISG has also created its own website, which allows easy access to information and projects. Projects include Yearly Information Exchange Sessions for new G30 freshman, seasonal merchandise, an NU G30 Discord server for current students and alumni, the newsletter "Nudge!", the podcast "Otsucare", game nights, seminars, and Nagoya University Model United Nations 2022 (in collaboration with NUFSA).

NUFSA (Nagoya University International Student Association)

The Nagoya University Foreign Student Association (NUFSA) was established in 1976, and its name was later changed to Nagoya University International Student Association. NUFSA's main objective is to promote and enhance international awareness, cooperation, cultural diversity and dialogue among international students, and between international students and Japanese students. NUFSA collaborates with several other associations and organizes events for international students, thus offering a platform for making international friends and supporting cultural exchange. To connect students, NUFSA holds interactive activities and events such as a Welcome Party, Spring and Fall Bazaar, Music Game Night, orientations for incoming international students, a series of interviews with Nagoya University students called “名 I ASK?” (“Mei I Ask?”), a Japanese Language & Culture course for family members of international students, Nagoya University Model United Nations in 2017 and 2022 (in collaboration with NUISG), Live Music Sessions, Board Game Nights, and Holiday Parties.

COFSA (Co-Op Foreign Student Association) 

Co-op Foreign Student Association (COFSA) caters to foreign and local students’ needs by organizing various activities that range from recreational events to career forums and community building projects. It was first established in 2015, and operates under the National University Co-op, an association that dates back to 1898, which provides nation-wide university services from cafeterias to bookstores with the goal of constructing a convenient lifestyle for students. The National University Co-op’s main mission is to foster cooperation amongst students and collaboration between Japanese universities, and COFSA was created as a byproduct of the National University Co-op to allow the Co-op to extend its mission to foreign students as well. One of COFSA's main goals is to curate events that celebrate cross-cultural exchange between local students and the diverse network of foreign students in Nagoya University. Its long-term goal is to not only provide students with a memorable and fulfilling university experience, but to also create an environment in which diverse students can share a sense of belonging and feeling of community.

COFSA makes sure to keep Nagoya University students engaged via accessible social media platforms such as Instagram. COFSA community building projects include a charity livestream event to bring awareness and raise funds for the Against Malaria Foundation (AMF) (which raised over 100,000 yen for the funding and distribution of insecticidal nets), as well as ‘International Food market’ and ‘Culinary masterclass’ where students can share their nation's cuisines. COFSA also hosts interactive events like ‘Jazz Night’ and ‘Open Mic: Stand Up Comedy’ to provide an avenue for Nagoya University students to showcase their unique talents. In light of the pandemic and reports of low mental health amongst students, COFSA compiled a ‘Mental health survey’ to gain some insights into the lives of NU students, and based on this set up various online gaming events such as ’Game Night’,’ Halloween Internet Mystery’, ’BFF Showdown’, ‘Halloween Gaming: Let’s Play Among Us’ and online hangout sessions such as ‘Speed Meet’ to provide a relaxed platform for students to actively interact with each other. Other events designed to promote interrelationship between students include ‘Conbini Hopping’, ‘Movie Nights’ ‘Harry Potter themed Halloween’ and Thanksgiving dinners.

To support the careers of Nagoya University students, ‘COFSA x Job Tree- Job hunting’ seminars are regularly conducted for international students seeking employment opportunities in Japan. This event is in collaboration with Nagoya University venture company ‘Job Tree Japan.’ A few events include ‘Let’s talk about Job Hunting with Panasonic’ and ’Casual Discussion with Toyota International Employee Juliette Tempia.’

COFSA frequently collaborates with several Nagoya University organizations to create more integrated events for students. Such events include ‘COFSA x ACE Japanese Calligraphy masterclass, ‘COFSA x NUFSA Christmas Concert’, ‘COFSA x NUISG Battle Night’ and regular meetings with ‘Small World Coffee Hour.’

HeForShe NU club 

The HeForShe NU club is a student organization with Japanese and International students at Nagoya University, with a mission to spread awareness about gender-related issues on campus and beyond. It was founded in 2017 by second-year JACS (G30) student Momo Mori. The first meetings consisted of her friends and interested people who came together to discuss gender-related topics, and the initial discussion was about the club’s name itself, ‘HeForShe’. From weekly meetings, the club branched out to organizing various events such as film screenings, guest speaking events, webinars (during the pandemic), and workshops about various topics. For instance, the club's theme for the year 2021 was to spread information about the menstrual period and period products in Japan, and it created a university-wide survey followed by a webinar and video project discussing the topic at the university. Its goal further on is to bring to light topics that are not often talked about in the open, such as period awareness, toxic masculinity and so on, in order to create a safer space for their discussion in the university campus.

HeForShe projects and activities include weekly meetings to discuss gender-related topics, film screenings, guest speaking events with experts in their fields (such as domestic violence victim support, health, politics, and so on) (2018-), a Sexual Harassment Awareness Workshop funded by the GRL library with a lecture by Professor Kitanaka from Hiroshima University on sexual harassment on Japanese varsity campuses followed by self-defense training (2018), participation in UN Women projects including Mother’s Day 2018 and 16 Days of Activism, giving interviews for non-profit organization Voice Up Japan for an article (2018), participating in the #heforsheプラスワン (heforshePlusOne) event with Nagoya University president Seiichi Matsuo at the UN University in Tokyo (sharing the stage with then UN Women executive director Phumzile Mlambo-Ngcuka) (2019), collaboration with @openarms.icu on a webinar ‘How to build a gender-equal workplace’ (2021), publishing a three-part video series called ‘Let’s talk about periods!’ (2021-present), and many more.

Notable alumni and affiliates
Full list can be found in the Japanese Wikipedia article: List of Nagoya University people (in Japanese)

Physics and Materials

Yoshio Ohnuki (大貫 義郎), a physicist, 1955-56 Nobel Prize in Physics nominee.
Hiroomi Umezawa (梅沢 博臣), a physicist, known for his fundamental contributions to quantum field theory.
Yasushi Takahashi (高橋 康), a physicist, known for the Ward–Takahashi identity.
Bunji Sakita (崎田 文二), a physicist, one of the discoverers of supersymmetry.
Sumio Iijima (飯島 澄男), a physicist, inventor of carbon nanotubes.
Akira Tonomura (外村 彰), a physicist, for his development of electron holography
Toshio Matsumoto (松本 敏雄), an astronomer, Professor Emeritus of JAXA.
Morinobu Endo (遠藤 守信), a physicist and chemist, pioneers of carbon nanofibers and carbon nanotubes synthesis.

Chemistry and Biology

Kuno Yasu (久野 寧), a physiologist, 1936, 1938, 1953 Nobel Prize in Physiology or Medicine nominee.
Yoshimasa Hirata (平田 義正), an organic chemist, known for "Hirata-school" in Japan.
Reiji Okazaki (岡崎 令治), Pioneering molecular biologists, discoverer of the Okazaki fragments, graduated from Nagoya and were both professor at the university.
Tsuneko Okazaki (岡崎 恆子), Pioneering molecular biologists, discoverer of the Okazaki fragments, graduated from Nagoya and were both professor at the university.
Hisashi Yamamoto (山本 尚), a Japanese chemist, laureate of the Medal of Honor with a Purple Ribbon.
Masatoshi Takeichi (竹市 雅俊), a Japanese cell biologist, 2005 Japan Prize winner.

Mathematics

Masayoshi Nagata (永田 雅宜), a Japanese mathematician, disproved Hilbert's fourteenth problem.
Goro Azumaya (東屋 五郎), a Japanese mathematician, introduced the notion of Azumaya algebra.
Masatake Kuranishi (倉西 正武), a Japanese mathematician, established the Cartan-Kuranishi Theorem.
Tomio Kubota (久保田 富雄), a Japanese mathematician.
Takashi Ono (小野 孝), a Japanese mathematician.
Hiroshi Umemura (mathematician) (梅村博), a Japanese mathematician who studied Painlevé equations, particularly Galois theory.

More notable alumni
Tang Jun, President and CEO of Xin Hua Du Industrial Group Co.
Uichiro Niwa - Japanese Ambassador to China, former Chairman and President of Itochu, former CEO of Japan Post Holdings
Shoichiro Toyoda - Ex-CEO of Toyota Motor

References

External links

Nagoya Repository - collection of scholarly papers and dissertations by the faculty and students of Nagoya University.
Information about the English-taught Full Degree Program
Courses offered in English

 
Educational institutions established in 1939
Japanese national universities
National Seven Universities
Universities and colleges in Nagoya
1939 establishments in Japan
Super Global Universities